Colebrook may refer to:

Places
Colebrook, Tasmania, a locality in the electoral division of Apsley, Australia
Colebrooke, Devon, England
Colebrook, Connecticut, U.S.
Colebrook, New Hampshire, U.S., a New England town
Colebrook (CDP), New Hampshire, U.S., village within the town
Colebrook Township, Ashtabula County, Ohio, U.S.
Colebrook Township, Clinton County, Pennsylvania, U.S.

Other uses
Colebrook equation, an implicit equation of pipe friction
Colebrook Home, a children's home for Australian Aboriginal children (1927–1981)
Joan Colebrook (1910–1991), Australian American journalist and author 
Leonard Colebrook (1883–1967), English physician

See also
Colebrooke (disambiguation)